The 2009 FIBA Europe Under-18 Women's Championship or simply known as the 2009 Youth EuroBasket, was the 26th edition of the Under-18 European Championships. This tournament was hosted by Sweden for the first time in the history of the championships. The tournament was awarded to Spain for the third time after defeating the France in the final, 64–54. The hosts, Sweden clinched the bronze medal after beating Czech Republic, 67–54.

Venues

Format

Preliminary round
All times are in Swedish Standard Time (UTC+2).

Group A

Group B

Group C

Group D

Second round

Group E

Group F

Classification Playoffs

Group G
The last placers of each group in the preliminary round will have the chance to win 13th place. This shall be played in a single round-robin classification. All games for this stage were held in Rosenborg.

Classification 9–12

Final round

Championship bracket

5th–8th place classification

Quarterfinals

5th-8th-place semifinals

Semifinals

Eleventh-place match

Ninth-place match

Seventh-place match

Battle for 5th place

Bronze-medal match

Final

Referees
The following referees were selected for the tournament:

 Milan Brizak
 Anna Cardus
 Piotr Ivashkov
 Paolo Taurino
 Martynas Gudas
 Zaza Machaladze
 Timothy Andrew Frederick Brown
 Carole Delauné
 Oskars Lucis
 Robert Vyklicky
 Borys Shulga
 Oscar Lefwerth

Final rankings

2011
2009–10 in European women's basketball
2009–10 in Swedish basketball
International women's basketball competitions hosted by Sweden
International youth basketball competitions hosted by Sweden
2009 in youth sport